Drosera dichrosepala, commonly known as the rusty sundew, is a pygmy sundew from Western Australia. It is a carnivorous plant. The specific epithet dichrosepala is a combination of the Greek words dis, meaning double, and chroia, meaning colour, as well as the Latin sepalum meaning sepal, it refers to the plant's sepals being bi-coloured. It has two subspecies: D. dichrosepala ssp.dichrosepala and D. dichrosepala ssp. enodes.

References

Carnivorous plants of Australia
dichrosepala
Eudicots of Western Australia
Caryophyllales of Australia